The polypropylene stacking chair or polyprop is a chair manufactured in an injection moulding process using polypropylene. It was designed by Robin Day in 1963 for S. Hille & Co. It is now so iconic, it was selected as one of eight designs in a 2009 series of British stamps of "British Design Classics."

This is one of the very few chairs that after over 50 years is still in production and has been made in forty countries around the world, for schools, hospitals, airports, canteens, restaurants, arenas, hotels, as well as homes. It is the best-selling chair in the world.

The chair first appeared on the market in a choice of charcoal or flame red colours at a little under £3 in price. The side chair won a Council of Industrial Design (now the Design Council) award in 1965.

The brief from Hille was for a low cost mass-produced stacking chair, affordable by all and to meet virtually every seating requirement.  Over time it became available in a wide variety of colours and with different forms of base and upholstery. These variations have included Series E for children, made in five sizes with lifting holes, and Polo with rows of graduated circular holes making it suitable for outdoor use.

The one-piece seat and back was injection moulded from polypropylene, a lightweight thermoplastic with a high impact resistance. Polypropylene was invented by an Italian scientist, Giulio Natta, in 1954.

Examples of the 1973 polypropylene stacking chair can be seen at Clifton Cathedral, Bristol, where it is used for the Nave and Sanctuary seating.

See Also 

 Monobloc (chair), another prominent injection moulded chair

References

External links 
http://www.hille.co.uk/
 Images of different models of the chair from the Visual 
Data Service (VADS).

Chairs
Individual models of furniture
Stacking chairs